Frederik Johannes Zeilinga (born 11 December 1992) is a South African rugby union player for Canon Eagles in the Japanese Top League. His regular position is fly-half.

Career

Youth

Sharks
He missed a conversion two minutes after coming on, but did convert one ten minutes later to help his team to a 30–19 victory.

He made three more substitute appearances during 2011 and was promoted to first choice fly-half for the Sharks during the 2012 Vodacom Cup competition, making a further seven starts. He also finished as top scorer in the 2012 Under-21 Provincial Championship, scoring 154 points in his ten appearances.

He also took over the kicking duties during the 2013 Vodacom Cup competition, where he once again scored in excess of 100 points in the season.

Sharks
He did appear as a substitute to make his Super Rugby debut and also scored a try in a 58–13 victory.

Cheetahs

References

South African rugby union players
Living people
1992 births
People from Ladysmith, KwaZulu-Natal
Sharks (Currie Cup) players
Sharks (rugby union) players
Rugby union fly-halves
Afrikaner people
Free State Cheetahs players
Cheetahs (rugby union) players
Yokohama Canon Eagles players
Lions (United Rugby Championship) players
Golden Lions players
Rugby union players from KwaZulu-Natal